The Tapiola swimming pool is a swimming pool centre in the district of Tapiola in Espoo, Finland. The centre was designed by Aarne Ervi and built in 1965. The building was renovated by Arkkitehdit NRT, and the renovation was completed in the 2000s. The renovation included an extension of the centre's premises, including steam saunas, jacuzzis, and a gym. In 2008, the centre was awarded the European Union Europa Nostra award for successful renovation.

Closure
The swimming hall was closed in 2016 due to humidity problems. There has been plenty of public debate on whether to demolish the existing building and build a new swimming hall, or instead build a new one somewhere else.

References

External links
 

Buildings and structures in Espoo
Swimming venues in Finland
Tapiola